The Thomas Metcalfe House in Robertson County, Kentucky was the first house of Thomas Metcalfe (1780–1855), 10th governor of Kentucky (during 1828–1832).  The house was built by Metcalfe, a stonemason and building contractor, in c.1810.

It was listed on the National Register of Historic Places in 1987 as Thomas Metcalf House, using an alternative accepted spelling of the governor's name;  the listing included the stone house and a smokehouse, on a  property that also included a non-contributing barn.

Its location was given in the 1984 document as "6/10 mile south of U.S. 61, 1-1/2 mile east of Kentucky 617, two miles east of Kentontown, near Mt. Olivet." This is 2.8 miles east of Kentontown by road or 4.5 miles southwest of Olivet by road.

A later home of Thomas Metcalfe, Forest Retreat in Nicholas County, is also listed on the National Register.

See also
List of buildings constructed by Thomas Metcalfe

References

Houses on the National Register of Historic Places in Kentucky
Federal architecture in Kentucky
Houses completed in 1810
Houses in Robertson County, Kentucky
Thomas Metcalfe buildings
National Register of Historic Places in Robertson County, Kentucky
Stone houses in Kentucky
1810 establishments in Kentucky